Monica Kurth is an American teacher and politician.

Kurth is from Davenport, Iowa. She taught at Scott Community College. In 2017, she won a special election to the Iowa House of Representatives to fill the seat vacated by Jim Lykam for the 89th district. She subsequently won reelection in 2018 and 2020. She is a member of the Democratic Party.

Election history

2017

2018 
Kurth ran unopposed in both the primary and general elections in 2018.

2020

References

Living people
Schoolteachers from Iowa
American women educators
Politicians from Davenport, Iowa
Year of birth missing (living people)
Democratic Party members of the Iowa House of Representatives
21st-century American women politicians